Ivan Nikolayevich Anikeyev (12 February 1933  8 August 1992) was a Soviet cosmonaut who was dismissed from the Soviet space program for disciplinary reasons.  

Senior Lieutenant Anikeyev, age 27, was selected as one of the original 20 cosmonauts on 7 March 1960 along with Yuri Gagarin. 

On 27 March 1963 Anikeyev, Grigory Nelyubov and Valentin Filatyev were arrested for drunk and disorderly conduct by the militsia at Chkalovsky station.  According to reports, the officers of the security patrol that arrested them were willing to ignore the whole incident if the cosmonauts apologized; Anikeyev and Filatyev agreed but Nelyubov refused, and the matter was reported to the authorities. Because there had been previous incidents, all three were dismissed from the cosmonaut corps on 17 April 1963, though officially not until 4 May 1963. Anikeyev never completed a space mission.

To protect the image of the space program, efforts were made to cover up the reason for Anikeyev's dismissal.  His image was airbrushed out of cosmonaut photos. This airbrushing led to speculation about "lost cosmonauts" even though the actual reasons were often mundane.

Alexei Leonov recounts that years later, while Anikeyev was at a party one night, someone stole his keys from his pocket and stole his car. The thief hit and killed a pedestrian, and to avoid responsibility, returned the keys to Anikeyev's pocket. The latter was sent to prison for a year before authorities realized he was innocent and released him, but he was never given the chance to fly again.

References

External links
 Details of the Soviet training program and launch
 Biographical details
 Titov recounts about disappearing cosmonauts #4 Research topic
 Straight Dope entry about lost cosmonauts

1933 births
1992 deaths
Soviet cosmonauts
Place of birth missing
Soviet Air Force officers